Frank Turner / Tim Barry is a split 7-inch EP by folk punk musicians Frank Turner and Tim Barry. It was released on October 13, 2009, on Suburban Home Records in the United States on 500 on black vinyl and 1000 on blue. The single was available on pre-order from Vinyl Collective and at the 2009 Revival Tour where both artists were playing. The release features a code that allows the buyer to download a digital copy of the tracks from the Suburban Home Records website.

Track listing
Side A
Tim Barry - "Thing of the Past" - 3:54

Side B
Frank Turner - "Try This at Home" (Acoustic) - 1:56

Tim Barry's personnel

Musicians 
Tim Barry - vocals, acoustic guitar
Josh Small - electric guitar
Lance Koehler - drums, tambourine
Charles Arthur - Lap Steel
Josh Bearman Bass

Recording personnel
Tim Barry
Lance Koehler - Engineer, Producer

Artwork
Chrissy Piper - Photo
Ryan Patterson - Layout, Auxiliary Design

References

2009 EPs
Frank Turner albums
Tim Barry albums
Split EPs
Suburban Home Records albums